Elections were held in the organized municipalities in the Nipissing District of Ontario on October 22, 2018 in conjunction with municipal elections across the province.

Bonfield

Mayor

Source:

Calvin

Mayor

Source:

Chisholm

Mayor

East Ferris

Mayor

Mattawa

Mayor

Mattawan

Mayor

North Bay

Mayor

Source:

North Bay City Council
10 to be elected

Source:

Papineau-Cameron

Mayor

Source:

South Algonquin

Mayor

Temagami

Mayor

Source:

West Nipissing

Mayor

Source:

References

Nipissing
Nipissing District